The Teatro Titano is a theatre located in the City of San Marino. It was built in 1750 and was renovated in 1936. The theatre has a capacity of 315 seats.

See also
 City of San Marino

References

External links

Buildings and structures in the City of San Marino